La Tour-Maubourg is a station on Line 8 of the Paris Métro. It is located to the northwest of Les Invalides in the 7th arrondissement. In 2019, 2,139,593 riders used La Tour-Maubourg, which makes it the 236th Métro station out of 302 for passenger traffic.

History
The station was opened on 13 July 1913 as part of the original section of Line 8 between Beaugrenelle (now Charles Michels, which is on Line 10) and Opéra. It is named after the Boulevard de la Tour-Maubourg, which commemorates Victor de Fay de La Tour-Maubourg (1768–1850), who was a general under Napoleon, Minister of War after the Restoration and then Governor of Les Invalides from 1821 to 1830.

Station layout

Gallery

References

Paris Métro stations in the 7th arrondissement of Paris
Railway stations in France opened in 1913